Cindy Lee is a Canadian businesswoman who founded T&T Supermarket, the largest retail grocery chain in Canada that sells Asian foodstuffs. She became president and CEO in 1993. Lee retired as CEO in 2014 and was succeeded by her daughter, Tina Lee. Cindy Lee sits on T&T Supermarkets' board of directors.

Biography
Lee was born in Taiwan, one of eight children in a family of entrepreneurs. She studied accounting at the National Chengchi University in Taiwan and immigrated to Canada in 1976. She worked as a bookkeeper, and has been married to her husband Jack since 1978. They have three children.

References

Living people
Bookkeepers
Canadian retail chief executives
Canadian women in business
National Chengchi University alumni
Naturalized citizens of Canada
Taiwanese emigrants to Canada
Year of birth missing (living people)
Canadian women business executives